Paul Zimmer  (born 1934 in Canton, Ohio) is an American poet, and editor.

Life
He flunked out of college, and worked in a steel mill.
From 1954 to 1955 Zimmer served in the United States Army as a journalist. The Ribs of Death, his first book, was published in 1968.
He received a Bachelor of Arts and Science degree from Kent State University in 1968.

He has directed the university presses at Georgia, Iowa, and Pittsburgh, and helped found the Pitt Poetry Series.
His papers are held at Kent State.

Awards
 Open Book Award from the American Society of Journalists and Authors
 American Academy and Institute of Arts and Letters
 1998 National Poetry Series, for The Great Bird of Love
 Distinguished Alumni Award from the College of Arts and Sciences at Kent State University in 2004.
 Two NEA fellowships
 Helen Bullis Memorial Award
 Two Pushcart Prizes
 An Ohioana Award in 2005

Works
 The Ribs of Death, October House, 1967
 The Republic of Many Voices, October House, 1969
 A Seed in the Wind, Three Rivers Press, C.M.U., 1975
 
 
 Family Reunion: Selected and New Poems (1983)
 The Great Bird of Love (1989)

Anthologies

Memoir

Reviews
It is not often that a “new and selected” documents the progressions, departures, and returns of a writer’s consciousness as lucidly and profoundly as Paul Zimmer’s Crossing to Sunlight Revisited (the long-awaited sequel to 1996's Crossing to Sunlight: Selected Poems). Zimmer’s newer poems are at the start of the book; they chronicle his ascension into, what seems to be, comfortable old age. Note that “old” is not my word here; in fact, in his preface, Zimmer informs us that he is “no longer an aging poet or an older poet.” He says, “I am an old poet.”

References

External links

Dryad Press records at the University of Maryland Libraries.  This collection contains correspondence, manuscripts, and publication materials from Zimmer.

1934 births
Living people
Poets from Ohio
Writers from Canton, Ohio
Kent State University alumni